Sergei Alexandrovich Zhevakin (April 11, 1916 – February 21, 2001) was a Russian astronomer.

Zhevakin is credited for identifying ionized helium as the valve for the heat engine that drives the pulsation of Cepheid variable stars.

Early life and education

S. A. Zhevakin was born on April 11, 1916 in Moscow. The family moved to Nizhny Novgorod in the late 1920s. Zhevakin graduated from N. I. Lobachevsky State University of Nizhny Novgorod in 1939, and, after two years of working at various local factories, entered a graduate program in 1941. However, because of the invasion of Nazi Germany, he was conscripted into the army in July 1941, where he served with distinction until January 1946. Zhevakin was wounded twice.

After returning to graduate school, he defended his thesis in 1949.

References

External links
 Цефеиды - звезды, которые дышат (К 90-летию С.А. Жевакина)

Soviet astronomers
Soviet physicists
1916 births
2001 deaths